Nazhikakkallu is a 1970 Indian Malayalam film,  directed by Sudin Menon and produced by C Vasudevan Nair. The film stars Prem Nazir, Sheela, Ramachandran and Sankaradi in the lead roles. The film had musical score by Kanu Ghosh.

Cast

Prem Nazir as Suresh
Sheela as Leela
Ramachandran
Sankaradi
T. R. Omana as Mrs. Menon
Bahadoor as Pachupilla
G. K. Pillai as Aadi narayanan Thambi
Kaduvakulam Antony as Thomas
M. L. Saraswathi
Madhubala
Nellikode Bhaskaran as Kurup
Omana
P. R. Menon
S. P. Pillai as Gopalan
Shyam Kumar
Sreekumar
Treesa
Usha
Usharani as Vidhya (Suresh's Sister)
Vincent
Shylashri
 Devan
 Nambyar
 Gopi Chandran
 Ramachandran
 Vineeth
 Kamalam

Soundtrack
The music was composed by Kanu Ghosh and the lyrics were written by Sreekumaran Thampi.

References

External links
 

1970 films
1970s Malayalam-language films